The Sukhoi Su-30MKK (NATO reporting name: Flanker-G) is a modification of the Sukhoi Su-30, incorporating advanced technology from the Sukhoi Su-35 variant. The Su-30MKK was developed by Sukhoi in 1997, as a result of a direct Request for tender between the Russian Federation and China. It is a heavy class, all-weather, long-range strike fighter, and like the Sukhoi Su-30, comparable to the American McDonnell Douglas F-15E Strike Eagle. Su-30MK2 is a further improvement to Su-30MKK with upgraded avionics and maritime strike capabilities. The MKK and MK2 are currently operated by the People's Liberation Army Air Force, Indonesian Air Force, Vietnam People's Air Force, Venezuelan Air Force and the Ugandan Air Force.

Development

The People's Liberation Army Air Force (PLAAF) leadership became concerned by the United States Air Force's (USAF) expanding defended-airspace-penetration and precision-strike capability during the 1990s. As defensive orientated tactics were dropped and more aggressive stances were adopted, the requirement for a heavy fighter with a large combat radius and a precision-guided munition employment capability was placed upon the political leadership of the People's Republic of China.

During a visit to the Russian Federation at the end of 1996, Chinese Premier Li Peng signed an agreement worth US$1.8 billion to purchase 38 advanced Multirole combat aircraft. Technical negotiations started right away.

Sukhoi saw enormous potential to meet China's requirement with its Su-30MK, while incorporating technology from the Su-27M, to develop a new fighter that preserved the type's iconic tall and thick Carbon-fiber-reinforced polymer fins as fuel tanks for longer range. The type was to be designated as Su-30MKK ("Modernizirovannyi Kommercheskiy Kitayski" – Modernised Commercial for China).

Final details of the agreement were settled during the Zhuhai Air Show in 1998. The official agreement was signed in Russia by the Chinese Premier Zhu Rongji in March 1999. That same month, a "Bort 501 Blue" prototype made its first flight at the Zhukovsky Air Base.

In November 2000, "Bort 502 Blue" attended the Zhuhai Air Show and a month later the first batch of ten Su-30MKK was delivered. A second batch of 10 were delivered on 21 August 2001, with the third batch of 18 following in December.

In July 2001, Chinese President Jiang Zemin and his Russian counterpart, Vladimir Putin, signed a deal for a further 38 aircraft.

In the year 2002, the two countries were negotiating on the purchase of the Su-30MK2 for the People's Liberation Army Naval Air Force (PLANAF). The variant had a revised weapon control system for the Kh-31A air-to-surface missile. A contract for 24 aircraft to be built by KnAAPO was signed in early 2003. All were delivered in 2004.

Design

Su-30MKK shares compatibility with Su-35 in terms of hardware, but in terms of software, Su-30MKK differs from Su-35 (Flanker-E) on a much greater scale in comparison to Indian Su-30MKI because of different mission requirements by China. The Flanker family aircraft has the problem of the reduction of maximum g-force level being decreased to 7g from the 9g at speed between Mach 0.7 to Mach 0.9, and this problem was completely solved on Su-30MKK by adopting new measures. According to the Sukhoi Design Bureau, Su-30MKK is the first of the Flanker family to achieve it after Su-35 / 37 (Flanker-E/F) and Sukhoi Su-30MKI. Higher percentage of composite material is used for Su-30MKK in comparison to the original Su-30MK. In addition, new aluminum alloy were used to replace the old type used on Su-30MK for weight reduction. The twin rudders mainly made of carbon fiber composite material were larger on Su-30MKK in comparison to that of the original Su-30MK, but contrary to what was once erroneously claimed by some western sources, Sukhoi Design Bureau revealed later that the increased space in the rudders were used for additional fuel tanks, instead of larger communication UHF antenna. The capacity of the fuel tanks in the wings is also increased. A twin nose landing gear of size 620 mm x 180 mm has replaced the single nose landing gear of size 680 mm x 260 mm used on Su-30MK to accommodate the increased weight. The maximum take-off weight and weapon load are increased to 38 tons and 12 tons respectively, but this extreme limit is often avoided by taking off at lighter weight. It was rumored that the Chinese pilots were not as experienced as Russian test pilots when operating at this extreme limits, which contributed to the crashes at least partially. The original K-36 ejection seat on Su-30MK is replaced by K-36M ejection seat for Su-30MKK.

Fuel capacity
In addition to the newly added fuel tanks in the rudders capacity totaling 280 kg, there are four main fuel tanks. No. 1 tank with capacity totaling 3,150 kg is in the front, No. 2 tank with capacity totaling 4,150 kg is in the middle, No. 3 tank with capacity totaling 1,053 kg is in the rear, and No. 4 tank with capacity totaling 1,552 kg is located in the wings. During aerial refueling, the maximum capacity of Su-30MKK is receiving up to 2,300 liters (1932 kg) per minute. The altitude of refueling is limited to 2 km to 6 km ( 6500-19,000 ft)and the speed is limited to 450–550 km/h (242-296 knots). Aerial refueling probe is located in front of cockpit on the left, and the design is capable of night refueling.

Engine
The main power plants are two AL-31F engines that provide great maneuverability and thrust. Range can be extended with the aerial refueling probe. Domestic Chinese resources have claimed that the Chinese engine WS-10 with higher mean time between overhaul can also be used, but this is yet to be confirmed by the official sources and sources outside China. The average Mean time between failures of AL-31F is only slightly above 500 hours, significantly lower than its western counterparts, the same problem reportedly encountered by Indian Air Force for its Su-30MKI fleet.

Avionics
According to Sukhoi Design Bureau, many of the new avionics and upgrades of current avionics were specially developed to meet the Chinese requirement, and subsequently used on other members of the Flanker family, including the more advanced versions that appeared later, and this was mainly due to the fact that the funding for Su-30MKK was readily available in comparison to others. The primary contractors / system integrator for Su-30MKK avionics was RPKB Instrumentation Design Bureau headquartered at Ramenskoye, and many new measures were adopted to meet the Chinese requirement, such as the open architecture software design. The development of avionics for the Su-30MKK was also assisted by 12 Ukrainian factories, based in Kiev.

Communications
The encrypted VHF/UHF communication radio of Su-30MKK has a maximum range in excess of 400 km, while the encrypted HF communication radio of Su-30MKK has a maximum range in excess of 1,500 km, and all can be used for both air-to-air or air-to-ground two-way communications. Su-30MKK is the first of Flanker family to be equipped with TKS-2 C3 system, which is capable of simultaneously commanding and controlling up to 15 aircraft with such system, and the air-to-air missiles launched by these aircraft. According to the developer of the system, Russkaya Avionika JSC, the encrypted two-way communication Command, control, and communications system can be either commanded or controlled by ground stations, or act as the command/control center for other aircraft. The system is claimed by the Russian developer as a huge leap forward in comparison to the similar rudimentary system on Su-27, which is only capable of one way communication. The new system is also the first among Russian system that is capable of forming a local area network like similar system on American Grumman F-14 Tomcat.

Electronic warfare systems
Russian sources have claimed that the electronic warfare systems of Su-30MKK utilizes the latest technologies available in Russia and the radar warning receivers are so effective that the information provided by RWR alone would be enough to provide targeting information for Kh-31P anti-radiation missile without using other detection systems on board, though information can also be provided by L-150 ELINT system, which can be used in conjunction with Kh-31P. The maximum range of the RWR is termed at several hundred kilometers, and based on the 200 km maximum range of the Kh-31P anti-radiation missile, the maximum should be at least that much. The threat information obtained from RWRs can be either provided on the LCD MFDs (showing the most dangerous four targets) for the pilot in the manual mode, or be used automatically. The active jamming pods are mounted on the wing tips, and the APP-50 decoy launcher is mounted near the tail cone with 96 decoys of different kinds. Domestic Chinese electronic warfare systems including BM/KG300G and KZ900 can also be carried after modification of onboard system, but such modification was neither part of the original deal nor the upgrade deal with Russians, instead, this was implemented indigenously by Chinese themselves during the incremental upgrades.

Flight control
The fly by wire (FBW) control with quadruple redundancy designed by Russkaya Avionika is the same system used for the Su-30MKI. Russian sources have confirmed the claims of domestic Chinese sources that an indigenous Chinese system developed is near its completion and it will be used to replace the original Russian system. However, this has yet to be confirmed by western sources and official Chinese governmental sources, which only acknowledged in the 6th Zhuhai Airshow that domestic fly-by-wire control with quadruple redundancy is developed to accommodate domestic engines, but nothing was mentioned about whether the domestic system and engines would be used on future Su-30MKK upgrades.

Flight instruments
The Su-30MKK features a glass cockpit of Russkaya Avionika JSC, with each pilot having two large multi-function displays, rear pilot displays arranged in a rather unconventional way: one atop of the other. Two  MFI-9 colour LCD MFDs are located in the front seat, a single MFI-9 and a  MFI-10 color LCD MFDs are located in the rear seat. The head-up display (HUD) is also developed by Russkaya Avonika JSC, designated as SILS-30.

Helmet mounted sight
The original ASP-PVD-21 series helmet mounted sight (HMS) with only limited field of view (FoV) was replaced by more advanced Sura-K HMS system, but Chinese have been replacing the Russian HMS with more advanced domestic system. Publicized photos and video clips from the official Chinese governmental sources such as CCTV-7 in 2007 and PLA pictorial magazine have confirmed the western claims of Chinese is replacing the original Russian helmet mounted sights (HMS) with more capable domestic ones.

Mission computer
The new mission computer was jointly developed by the Russian National Aeronautical System Science Research Academy and Russkaya Avionika JSC, designated as MVK, capable of performing ten billion FLOPS. All avionics on board is built to MIL-STD-1553 standard. There are four computers based on Baguet-55 series processor, one for central avionics control, two for information display, and one for fire control.

Navigation
The integrated navigational systems designated as PNS-10, incorporating the A737 subsystem. The system is capable of utilizing both the GPS and GLONASS, but it is rumored that Chinese is developing a similar system to add the capability to utilize domestic BeiDou Navigation Satellite System.

Airborne radar

Airborne radar on board Su-30MKK has been continuously upgraded and a total of three were confirmed so far, all of which are controlled by the RLPK-27VE integrated radar targeting system, developed from the RLPK-27 system of the single seat Su-27. Both systems are designed by Viktor Grishin of the Tikhomirov Scientific Research Institute of Instrument Design (NIIP), and is compatible with various radar and weaponry systems.
N001VEP radar: The first 20 Su-30MKK have an N001VEP Passive electronically scanned array (PESA) fire-control radar by the Chief designer Viktor Grishin of the Tikhomirov Scientific Research Institute of Instrument Design (NIIP) with a range up to 100 km, able to concurrently track 10 targets, and engage four air targets or two ground targets of the 10 tracked. The N001VEP is developed from the earlier N001VE radar designed by the same designer, which was used on the Chinese J-11A. The original Baguet series processor of the N001VE radar is replaced by its successor Baguet-55 series. Like its predecessor, the new radar has incorporated the moving target indication (MTI) and mapping capabilities, and the capability to detect low flying or hovering helicopters. The scan sector of it is 120 degrees while the elevation is 110 degrees.
Zhuk (radar)-MS radar: From the 21st Su-30MKK on, the N001VEP radar is replaced by the Zhuk-MS (Beetle-MS) fire control radar of Tikhomirov (NIIP)'s competitor, Phazotron (NIIR), which also adopts a slotted planar array antenna like N001VEP radar. The new radar has longer range coverage (up to 150 km) and is able to guide a greater variety of weapons systems. The number of targets that can be engaged is identical to that of the N001VEP radar, but the number that can be simultaneously tracked has been doubled to 20. The Zhuk (Beetle)-MS radar is an improvement of the earlier Zhuk (Beetle) radar designed for Su-27 and MiG-29 upgrades, and in comparison to the original Zhuk radar, the Zhuk-MS has the following improvements in addition to increased range and number of targets tracked/engaged:
 The antenna diameter is increased to 960 mm from the original 680 mm of Zhuk (Beetle) radar
 The peak power is increased to 6 kW from the original 5 kW of Zhuk (Beetle) radar
 The average power is increased to 1.5 kW from the original 1 kW of Zhuk (Beetle) radar
 Contrary to many erroneous claims, Zhuk-MS is not a phased array radar, but a slotted planar array antenna.
Zhuk-MSE radar: The Zhuk-MS has been replaced by its successor, Zhuk-MSE in the incremental upgrades of Su-30MKK, and previous Zhuk-MS are being upgraded to the Zhuk-MSE level. In comparison to the predecessor most performance parameters remain the same, but the number of ground targets that can be simultaneously engaged is increased to four from the original two. Like Zhuk-MS, this radar has also been erroneously reported to be a phased array radar when in fact, it utilizes a slotted planar array antenna. The designer Phazotron has claimed the new radar has better ECCM capabilities than earlier models.

At the 6th Zhuhai Airshow held in 2006, Russian designers at a news conference revealed to Chinese journalists that they had been working with the Chinese to develop a passive electronically scanned array radar to upgrade Su-27SK and Su-30MKKs, but stopped short of releasing any additional information. These Russian radar designers were Phazotron employees, not Tikhomirov, the usual radar supplier for the Flanker family. Some domestic Chinese media have claimed the phased array radar is the Zhuk-MSF, but this has yet to be confirmed.
It is also possible that the Chinese may use the same radar used on its newest J-11b's radar which will significantly increase Su-30MKK's performance, because J-11B's radar will increase the Su-30MKK's radar range up to 350 km, and allow it to engage up to four air-to-air and four ground targets.

Fire control system

The fire control system on board integrates the radar, optronics, helmet-mounted sight, electronic warfare gears including radar warning receivers, and data links. The system consists of two subsystems: the SUV-VEP air-to-air subsystem and the SUV-P air-to-ground subsystem.
SUV-VEP: this air-to-air subsystem is capable of controlling six air-to-air missiles, which is greater than the maximum number of targets the airborne radar on board Su-30MKK can simultaneously engage, thus leaving rooms for radar improvement, which would be later exploited when the new passive electronically scanned array radars have been installed on Su-30MK2. The SUV-VEP subsystem is also capable of controlling air-to-sea missions, and the fire control of Kh-31A and Kh-35 anti-ship missiles are usually provided by SUV-VEP air-to-air subsystem instead of SUV-P air-to-ground subsystem. The subsystem of SUV-VEP system includes four major portions:
SEI-31-10 Integrated Display system: Used to control LCD MFDs.
OEPS-30 optronic (electro-optical) detection system: Chinese call this system optronic radar system, and it consists of two major components:
OLS-30 (52Sh) Infra-red search and track weighing 200 kg includes laser and IR sensors. In comparison to its predecessor OLS-27 (Izdeliye 36Sh) on Su-27, the IR detection range nearly doubled to > 90 km from the original 50 km. The range of laser range finder is increased to > 10 km from the original 6 km.
Sura-K helmet mounted system (HMS): The field of view (FoV) is greatly increased to +/- 60 degrees in comparison to the +/- 8 degrees of the ASP-PVD-21 HMS originally used on Su-27.
IFF and airborne radar are also controlled by SUV-VEP system.
SUV-P: this air-to-ground subsystem utilizes identical hardware of SUV-VEP air-to-air subsystem, but with a different processing requirement. This subsystem is mainly used for air-to-surface missiles such as Kh-59, and acts as an interface between the system on board the aircraft and the designated targeting pods of the air-to-surface missiles that can not be controlled directly by the onboard avionics. The primary subsystem of SUV-P system is SUO-30PK subsystem and A-737 satellite navigational subsystem.
SUO-30PK weaponry control subsystem: though Kh-31 is often controlled by SUV-VEP air-to-air system, it can also be controlled via SUV-P system via SUO-30PK subsystem, which can also control L-150 ELINT system. SUO-30PK system also controls other missiles such as Kh-59, an air-to-ground missiles that is controlled via Tekon targeting system in the APK-9E pod. Other SUO-30PK subsystem is developed by Aviation Automation Design bureau at Kursk, and it can be used to control unguided air-to-ground weaponry.
Both the SUV-VEP and SUV-P systems were adopted to upgrade the single seat Su-27SK in Chinese inventory, and a joint team of Tikhomirov Scientific Research Institute of Instrument Design (NIIP) and State Instrumentation Plant at Ryazan was named as the primary contractor. The modified SUV-VEP system adopted to upgrade Chinese Su-27SK was designated as SUV-VE, while the modified SUV-P system adopted to upgrade Chinese Su-27SK was designated as SUV-PE. The original analog dial indicator on flight dashboard of Su-27SK were replaced by two 6 in x 6 in MFI-10-6M and a MFIP-6 LCD MFDs. According to Russian claim, over 60 Chinese Su-27SK have been upgraded by the end of 2006.

Su-30MK2

With its improved avionics, the MK2 was designed for more dedicated use as a maritime strike aircraft, thus these aircraft ordered by China are currently being operated by the Naval Air Force. The MK2 also features a better C4ISTAR (command, control, communications, computers, intelligence, surveillance, target acquisition and reconnaissance) abilities than the MKKs.

Mission computer
The original MVK mission computer is replaced by its successor MVK-RL, with greater capability.

Communications
The TKS-2 C3 system is replaced by the follow-on TSIMSS-1 digital system.

Flight instruments
The two  MFI-9 colour LCD MFDs in the front cockpit and the MFI-9 and the  MFI-10 color LCD MFDs in the rear cockpit are replaced with four 158 mm x 211 mm MFI-10-5 LCD MFDs. The configuration of the new displays remains the same as that of Su-30MKK.

Optronics
One of the important avionic upgrades of Su-30MK2 is the incorporation of several electro-optical (optronics) pods, a capability that is added to earlier Su-30MKK during upgrades. Two types of Russian optronic pods are sold to China for Su-30MK2, but the open architecture and other advanced designs enabled the aircraft to carry domestic optronic pods as well. This capability of Su-30MK2 has been added to the original Su-30MKKs during the incremental upgrades. The Russian optronic pods included:
Optronic pod "Sapsan-E": Sapsan (peregrine falcon)-E targeting pod developed by the Ural Optical Machinery Plant weighs 250 kg, with length of 3 m and diameter of 0.39 m. Field of view is from +10 degrees to −15 degrees, and the system includes TV camera and laser designators. This system is designed to supplement the OEPS-30MK-E optronic system mounted in the nose of the aircraft.
M400 reconnaissance pod: M400 reconnaissance pod developed by the Canopy Design Bureau is a large pod mounted between two engines. In comparison to Sapsan-E targeting pod, there is different equipment in the M400 reconnaissance pod: TV/Thermographic cameras, optical camera and Side looking airborne radar. The side-looking radar has a maximum range in excess of 100 km with resolution of 2 metres, while the maximum range for both IR and TV cameras are in excess of 70 km. The resolution of the TV/IR camera is 0.3-metre and 0.4-metre for the optical camera. The system can also be used to detect the blind spot behind the aircraft to provide targeting information for rearward-firing air-to-air missiles, but this capability has not been utilized by the Chinese yet. The system is also capable of locking on sea targets.
Domestic Chinese optronics including FILAT and Blue Sky (navigation pod) can also be carried after modification of onboard system. Just like the incorporation of domestic Chinese electronic warfare pods such as BM/KG300G and KZ900 to Su-30MKK, such modification was neither part of the original deal nor the upgrade deal with Russians, instead, this was implemented indigenously by the Chinese themselves during the incremental upgrades. According to Chinese claims, the domestic upgrade of Su-30MKK/MK2 were much smoother and easier than that of earlier Su-27SK, thanks to the western MIL-STD-1553 standard Russian adopted for Su-30MKK series.

Airborne radar
In 2000, China placed an order of passive electronically scanned array radar named Sokol (Falcon), designed by Phazotron, while the radar was still under development, it is reported that China had either partially funded or joined the development, but this can not be confirmed. All twenty units were delivered in 2004 after the development completed at the end of 2003, and the radars are installed on the Su-30MK2. The maximum range, average and peak power of Sokol radar remain the same as that of Zhuk-MSE radar on Su-30MKK, but the maximum number of targets it can simultaneously track actually decreased by 40%, from the original 20 to 12. However, the number of targets it can simultaneously engage is increased to six from the original four, thus fully utilizing the capability of the SUV-VEP subsystem of the onboard fire control system. The diameter of the antenna array is increased to 980 mm from the 960 mm of Zhuk-MS/MSE. The scan sector of the radar is 170 degrees and the elevation of the scan is from −40 degrees to +56 degrees. The radar has three receivers and a gain of 37 dB. When used against surface targets like a destroyer, the maximum range is doubled to 300 km, same as that of American AN/APG-68. There is not any confirmation for any follow-on orders of Sokol radar and unlike the capability optronic pod, this radar capability is not known to be added to the earlier Su-30MKKs during the incremental upgrades.

In the early 2000s, Russia had authorized the export of Pero passive electronically scanned array radar designed by Tikhomirov, to China. The Pero antenna can be easily integrated into the existing N001VEP radar system with no significant modification by simply replacing the original slotted planar array, and thus results in increased performance. The Pero upgrade, lets the radar simultaneously engage 6 aerial targets, or 4 ground targets. The radar with Pero antenna is named as Panda radar. China, however, did not accept the offer when Russia offered the Pero upgrade package because Tikhomirov's competitor Phazotron offered China a brand new phased array radar that supposedly performed better, rumored to be Zhuk-MSF. In addition to the easy of integration, the advantage of Pero passive electronically scanned array equipped Panda radar was its weight. All other radars offered for Su-30MK2 upgrade increase weight significantly that the center of the gravity of the aircraft is altered, resulting in the need to modify the airframe and redesign the flight control system. Such problems does not exist if Panda radar is adopted because it only increases the weight by a mere 20 kg, which will be compensated by the redesign of SILS-30 HUD to reduce its weight by 20 kg, thus balancing out the weight increase of the radar. This claim of Timkhomirov design bureau is confirmed by both the Sukhoi design bureau and Russkaya Avionika bureau, which claimed to media reporters at 2006 Zhuhai Airshow in China that such modification had already been successfully completed. China, however, had not made a final decision by the end of 2007, and many Russian and Chinese sources have claimed that domestic Chinese HUDs of Western origin perform better and weigh much less, and China thus planned to adopt their own avionics in the next incremental upgrade, but such claims have yet to be confirmed by western sources and official sources of Chinese and Russian governments.

In response, Tikhomirov subsequently offered China its N-011M Bars passive electronically scanned array radar, the most powerful Russian airborne radar on any of its exported aircraft, but China once again rejected the offer. Many claimed that the reason for the rejection was that Chinese discovered the same problem India had during the evaluation of the radar: although the N-011M Bars passive electronically scanned array radar offered longer range and better resistance to jamming, it had the problem of accurately and correct identifying targets at long range, while others claims China simply did not want the same system used by India. However, both claims contradict with the official explanation of the Chinese government: the new radar weighs more than 650 kg and caused the center of gravity of the aircraft to alter significantly, thus greatly degraded the aerodynamic performance and weapon payload arrangement of the Su-30MKK, which is far less adaptable to the new heavy radar than Su-30MKI, because the two were based on two totally different airframes, a fact that is confirmed by Jane's all the World's Aircraft. If the new radar was to be adopted, canards must be added and flight control software must be also modified for Su-30MKK just to remain the same level of performance as before, and thus, in addition to paying for the more expensive new radars, a huge amount of money must be spent in upgrading the aircraft as well.

Su-30MK3

The Su-30MK3 proposal was to possibly feature either the Phazotron Zhuk-MSF phased array radar, or a new "Panda" radar developed by Tikhomirov, which is based on Pero passive phased array radar, both were rumored to be under Chinese evaluation. Either radar would significantly improve the Su-30s air target detection range to 190 km and surface detection range at 300 km. It is uncertain whether the PLAN or PLAAF would order any of these aircraft, despite their significant advantages with their advanced radars. Therefore, if these radars passed Chinese tests, they will likely to be retrofitted to earlier MKK and MK2 and even possibly Shenyang J-11 due to uncertain status of MK3 project.

In January 2007, Russia confirmed that the newest Irbis-E (Snow leopard-E) phased array radar in Russia's inventory, developed by Tikhomirov, was offered to China. However, it is highly unlikely that China will adopt this newest Russian airborne radar because all models of the Su-30 series can only provide half of the power required for the 5 kW rated radar, and currently, only Sukhoi Su-35 and Sukhoi Su-37 have enough power to support this newest Russian airborne radar. Purchasing Irbis-E phased array radar would lock China into yet another deal with Russia to upgrade its Su-30MKK fleet that would greatly increase the cost, because China currently lacks the ability to do so by itself, or is forced to pay even higher prices to buy the Su-35 or Su-37.

China has actually ordered and commissioned the Su-35S while also developing its own J-16 which are claimed to be superior to the Russian Su-30 - especially in terms of sensors & avionics when the installation of AESA radars is reported. Since then, there was no actual updates or development reported from the project of Su-30MK3. In fact, the production line of the Su-30MK2 at the Komsomolsk-on-Amur Aircraft Plant (KnAAZ) has been shut down in late 2016 after completing the very last two Su-30MK2 airframes for Vietnam, leaving space for the production of the newer Su-35S and Su-57 at the same facilities. Eventually, there was no more order or formal offering for the KnAAZ-produced Su-30MKs.

Operators

 People's Liberation Army Air Force had 73 Su-30MKK fighters in service in 2010. 76 were delivered in 2000–2003. Introduced into service with the PLAAF Flight Test & Training Base at Cangzhou Air Force Base, Hebei Province (19 examples), the 3rd Air Division / 9th Fighter Regiment based at Wuhu Air Base, Anhui Province (19 examples), 18th Air Division at Datuopu Air Base (19 examples), Changsha, Hunan Province and 29th Air Division at Quzhou air base (19 examples). Su-30MKK is the first Chinese fighter jet to fully adapt radar active homing air-to-air missile, it is capable of launching R-77E missile. 
 People's Liberation Army Naval Air Force had 24 Su-30MK2s in service in 2010. Delivered in 2004, they were operated by the 4th Division / 10th Fighter Regiment based at Feidong air base, Zhejiang Province.

 Indonesian Air Force had 3 Su-30MK2 in service in 2009. Additional 6 aircraft have been delivered in 2013.

 Uganda People's Defence Air Force had 6 Su-30MK2 in service in 2012. Following signing of the contract in May 2012, deliveries were completed within twelve months. Price tag for the six fighters was settled at US$740 million. In August 2020 Military Watch Magazine reported that Uganda had 8 Su-30MK2 aircraft in service. Uganda signed a MOU with  Hindustan Aeronautics Ltd for maintenance and technical support.

 Venezuelan Air Force had 24 Su-30MK2 in service in 2008. One of Venezuela's planes crashed on a drug interdiction mission on 18 September 2015. In October 2015, Venezuela announced the purchase of 12 more Su-30MK2 from Russia for $480 million.

 Vietnam People's Air Force had a total number of 36 Su-30MK2 delivered, with one crashed in 2016.

Specifications (Su-30MKK)

See also

References

External links

 Sukhoi Su-30MK Su-30MKM fighter aircraft(Air recognition)

Su-30MKK
1980s Soviet fighter aircraft
Twinjets
Aircraft first flown in 2000
Twin-tail aircraft